is a city in Fukushima Prefecture, Japan. , the city had an estimated population of 59,625 in 22,843 households and a population density of 220 persons per km2.

Geography
Date occupies the eastern half of the Fukushima Basin in northern Fukushima prefecture, with Miyagi Prefecture on its northern border. The area was once noted for sericulture but transitioned to fruit cultivation during the Taishō period. It is currently organized into the five former towns of Date, Hobara, Yanagawa, Ryozen, and Tsukidate, each of which retain numerous unique traditions and events. Hobara is the central area, where the municipal government is based.

Rivers: Abukuma River, Hirose River

Neighboring municipalities
Fukushima Prefecture
 Sōma
 Fukushima
 Kunimi
 Kawamata
 Koori
 Iitate
Miyagi Prefecture
Shiroishi
Marumori

Climate
Date has a humid climate (Köppen climate classification Cfa).

Demographics
Per Japanese census data, the population of Date has declined over the past 70 years.

History
A whole body skeleton of Paleoparadoxia was excavated in Yanagawa on August 21, 1984. The skeleton is named the “Yanagawa Specimen”. The first humans to live within the bounds of present-day Date City are thought to have arrived during the Paleolithic Period. The area was part of ancient Mutsu Province. Towards the end of the Heian Period, Shinobu-gun (present day Fukushima City) and Date-gun (encompassing not only present day Date, but also Koori Town to the North and Kawamata Town to the South) were awarded to Date Tomomune. Tomomune founded the Date clan in present-day Hobara. The 17th lord of the Date Clan, Date Masamune lost control of the area and went on to found the Sendai Clan and the City of Sendai. The clan continued to rule over the Sendai Domain during the Edo period. However, under the Edo period Tokugawa shogunate, most of the area of Date was initially part of Yonezawa Domain, followed by Fukushima Domain and Yanagawa Domain before becoming  tenryō territory under direct control of the shogunate. It was not part of the Date Clan's territories. After the Meiji Restoration, the area was organized as part of Nakadōri region of Iwaki Province.

As of 1889,  at the time of the establishment of the modern municipalities system, the area consisted of 21 towns and villages. Between the years 1955 and 1960, these were consolidated into the five towns of Date (formerly the villages of Nagaoka and Fushiguro), Hobara (formerly the town of Hobara and the villages of Ooda, Kamihobara, Hashirazawa, and Tominari), Ryōzen (formerly the villages of Ryozen, Kakeda, Oguni, and Ishido), Tsukidate (formerly the villages of Ote and Otegawa), and Yanagawa (formerly the town of Yanagawa and the villages of Awano, Sekimoto, Shirane, Ooeda, Isazawa, Tomino, and Yamafunyuu), which merged to create the modern city of Date on January 1, 2006.

Although outside the nuclear accident exclusion zone, the levels of radiation in the city caused residents, and especially children, to remain indoors.

In 2016 an anime was produced in promotion of the city. Masamune Datenicle (政宗ダテニクル) features a young Date Masamune who meets a dragon deity that gives him the ability to call upon former leaders of the Date Clan.

Government
Date has a mayor-council form of government with a directly elected mayor and a unicameral city legislature of 22 members. Date, together with the three municipalities of Date District, collectively contribute three members to the Fukushima Prefectural Assembly. In terms of national politics, the city is part of Fukushima 1st district of the lower house of the Diet of Japan.

Economy
The economy of Date is primarily agricultural, with an emphasis on rice and horticulture. The area is noted for its peaches and dried persimmons.

Taiyo Yuden operates a metal power inductor production plant in the Yanagawa Industrial Zone in Date, Fukushima, which also produced CD, DVD and Blu-ray discs in the past.

Peaches 
Date City's location in central Fukushima (Nakadōri), in the middle of Fukushima Basin, helps in the cultivation of peaches. The most common varieties grown in the area are Akatsuki, Kawanakajima, and Yuuzora.

Dried Persimmons 
As sericulture lost its place in the area during the Taisho period, the former village of Isazawa in Yanagawa replaced it with the production of dried persimmons, among other industries. Dried persimmons had been produced in the area since the Edo Period. However, the addition of sulfur fumigation as was used in the production of raisins in the United States, allowed for a much sweeter product. Whereas traditional dried persimmons, hoshigaki, have a tough skin and are almost black in color, those created with the additional step of sulfur fumigation, called anpogaki or tsurushigaki, are soft and bright orange.

Although the production of anpogaki was halted for three years after the 2011 disaster, Date City's persimmon orchards have since been decontaminated and testing machines have been installed, ensuring the safety of the final product.

Education
Date City has fifteen public elementary schools, six public junior high schools, two public high schools, and one private high school:

Transportation

Railway
 East Japan Railway Company (JR East) -  Tōhoku Main Line 
 
AbukumaExpress – Abukuma Express Line
 -  -  -  -  -  -  -  -  -

Highway

Local attractions
Ryōzen Shrine
Mount Ryōzen, National Historic Site and National Place of Scenic Beauty
Miyawaki temple ruins, National Historic Site 
Former Kameoka Family Home
Takako Ni-juu Kyou 
 site of Takakogaoka Castle, the original home of the Date Clan
Takako Lake, one of Takako Ni-juu Kyou
site of Yanagawa Castle, constructed by the Date Clan and once home to Date Masamune
Yanagawa Hachiman Shrine, where Date Masamune prayed for victory in battle

Notable people from Date 
 Saitou Hikonai (斎藤彦内, 1709-1750) was a farmer and the leader of a peasants' revolt.
Seishiro Okazaki (January 28, 1890 – July 12, 1951) was a Japanese American healer, martial artist, and the founder of Danzan-ryū jujitsu. Born in the former village of Kakeda, he immigrated to Hawaii in 1906.
Yahei Miura (弥平三浦, 1895-1971) was a long-distance runner and Olympic athlete.

International relations
 - Sister cities with Revere, MA, USA since August, 2016
 - 2020 Tokyo Olympics "Arigatou" Host Town for the Republic of Guyana as of August, 2019

Notes

External links

Date City Commerce and Tourism Association Portal Site, "Date Megane" 

Cities in Fukushima Prefecture
Date, Fukushima